"Smooth" is the third single released from iiO's debut album, Poetica. The single peaked at number two in Finland, becoming the band's highest-charting hit there, and climbed to number 18 in Romania. The single did not find much success outside these countries, only managing to reach number 13 on the US Billboard Hot Dance Airplay chart.

Track listing

Charts

References

External links
 Smooth at discogs

2004 singles
2004 songs
IiO songs
Songs written by Nadia Ali (singer)